Valtiberina is a valley crossed by the upper course of the Tiber (which originates from Monte Fumaiolo in Emilia-Romagna), unfolding between Tuscany, Umbria and Romagna, parallel to the Casentino.

Geography
Valtiberina is bordered to the west by Alpe di Catenaia and to the east by Alpe della Luna.

The description of the valley made between the 1st and 2nd centuries AD is very famous. by Pliny the Younger (61-113) in a letter written to his friend Apollinare. Pliny had his favorite villa in Valtiberina and thus describes the landscape:

In recent times, the scholar Mariella Zoppi wrote:

Seismicity
Historically, Valtiberina has a medium-high level of seismicity. Among the earthquakes of the past, the strongest with ML between 5 and 6 were those of 1352–1353, 1358, 1389, 1458, 1558, 1694, 1781, 1789, 1917, of 1948, known as the Sansepolcro earthquake. More recently, there have been tremors in 1997 and 2001 with ML slightly higher than 4. In 1997, the shock of 2 October had its epicenter in Sansepolcro. According to legislative provision 3274 of 20 March 2003, the Valtiberina area has been classified as having medium seismic intensity, that is, among those areas in which seismic events, albeit of lesser intensity, can create very serious damage.

Climate
The climatic classification (ex DPR 412 of 26 August 1993) includes the Valtiberina among the areas of Italy in which it is possible to use natural gas heating in buildings from 15 October to 15 April for 14 hours a day.

References

Valleys of Tuscany
Valleys of Umbria